Melitta Kreckow Brunner (née Brunner, 28 January 1907 – 26 May 2003) was an Austrian figure skater. Competing in pairs with Ludwig Wrede, she became the 1928 Olympic bronze medalist and a three-time World medalist, winning two silvers and a bronze. As a single skater, she was the 1929 World bronze medalist.

After retiring from competitions Brunner taught skating in Switzerland and Great Britain. In December 1932 she married Paul Kreckow, a German figure skater from Berlin. They married in London, where they were giving skating demonstrations. After World War II, Brunner performed in ice shows in Europe, and then immigrated to the United States. There she continued skating, and coached skaters into her nineties.

Competitive highlights

Ladies' singles

Pairs with Ludwig Wrede

References

External links

Death website entry

Austrian female pair skaters
Austrian female single skaters
Olympic figure skaters of Austria
Olympic bronze medalists for Austria
Figure skaters at the 1928 Winter Olympics
1907 births
2003 deaths
Olympic medalists in figure skating
World Figure Skating Championships medalists
Medalists at the 1928 Winter Olympics